Johann Freitag von Loringhoven (c. 1430 - 26 May 1494), also known as Johann Freytag von Loringhoven, and Johann Fridach van Loringhoffe, was a knight of the Teutonic Knights and a member of the Freytag von Loringhoven family. Most notably, from 1483 to 1494, he was a Master (Landmiester) of the Livonian Order.

Biography 
Johann Frietag von Loringhoven was one of the eight knights of the Freytag von Loringhoven family that operated in Livonia. After the forced abdication of his predecessor, Bernhard von der Borch (1471-1483) he was elected as Master of the Livonian Order. He ended the 200-year struggle for power inside the Livonian Order by carefully balancing warfare and politics. In the Livonian civil war, he fought in the battles of Stinsee and the battle of Neuermuhlen (near Riga). After the civil war, his reign brought about the longest peacetime in ancient Livonian history. When the foreign enemies of Livonia began to make war against them, this peacetime had allowed Livonia to become a strong and religious state.

Von Loringhoven soon recognized the talent of Wolter von Plettenberg and appointed him Master in 1489.

References 
 H. Cosack: On the History of Foreign Involvement of the Order in Livonia 1478-83 , Baltic Studies on Archeology and History, Berlin 1914;
 H. Cosack: Livonia and Russia at the time of the Master of the Order Johann Freitag , HGbll, Vol. 28, 1926, Vol. 31, 1927.
 C. v. Stern: The guerrilla warfare around the eastern border in the 15th century , Baltic Monatshefte 1937.
 Wilhelm Lenz: "Johann Freytag von Loringhoven",Westfälische Lebensbilder , Vol. 9, Münster / Cologne 1962.
 Bernd Freiherr Freytag von Loringhoven: Freytag von Loringhoven - A Concise Family History , Munich, 1986.

 

Baltic-German people
Masters of the Livonian Order
1430s births
1494 deaths